Metzia hautus is a species of cyprinid in the genus Metzia. It inhabits Vietnam.

References

Cyprinidae
Cyprinid fish of Asia
Fish of Vietnam